This is a list of notable Guyanese British people.

John Agard, playwright, poet and children's writer
Waheed Alli (born 1964) media entrepreneur and politician, Indo-Guyanese father from Guyana
 Valerie Amos, Baroness Amos, Director of SOAS, University of London, UN representative, and Labour Peer in the House of Lords. Born British Guiana, 1954. 
 Shaheera Asante, broadcaster, environmental activist Cambridge, United Kingdom, Guyanese mother
 Thomas Baptiste, actor.*
 Tina Barrett, singer from S Club, Guyanese mother
Frank Bowling artist. Born British Guiana, 1934.  
 Gabrielle Brooks (born 1990), actress
 Bob Collymore (1958–2019), Vodafone executive and second CEO of Safaricom
 Peter Davison, actor known for All Creatures Great and Small and Doctor Who, Guyanese father
 Nubya Garcia (born 1991) jazz musician, Guyanese mother
Bernie Grant (1944–2000) British Labour Party politician, Member of Parliament for Tottenham, London, from 1987 to his death in 2000. Born Georgetown, British Guiana
 Eddy Grant (born 1948), Guyanese-born singer and musician
 Meiling Jin (born 1956), Guyanese-born writer
David Lammy (born 1972)  Labour Party politician serving as Member of Parliament (MP) for Tottenham. Guyanese mother and father
 Hew Locke, contemporary sculptor, son of Guyanese sculptor Donald Locke
 Phil Lynott, frontman of the rock band Thin Lizzy, with an Afro-Guyanese father
 Gina Miller, Guyanese-born business owner known for initiating the 2016 R (Miller and Dos Santos) v Secretary of State for Exiting the European Union court case against the British government over its authority to implement Brexit without approval from Parliament
 Grace Nichols (born 1950), poet
 Trevor Phillips (born 1953), former UK government equality advisor and broadcaster
 Jan Lowe Shinebourne (born 1947), Guyanese-born novelist
 Laurie Taitt (1934–2006), Olympic sprint hurdler
Aubrey Williams (1926–1990) artist. Born Georgetown, British Guiana
 James Justin

See also
Guyanese people

References

Guyanese
Guyanese Britons